Origny is a commune in the Côte-d'Or department in eastern France. 
Origny may also refer to 

Origny-en-Thiérache,  a commune in the Aisne department in Picardy in northern France 
Origny-Sainte-Benoite, a commune in the Aisne department in Picardy in northern France 
Origny-le-Sec, a commune in the Aube department in north-central France 
Origny-le-Roux, a commune in the Orne department in north-western France 
Origny-le-Butin a commune in the Orne department in north-western France